Ronnie Baxter (born 5 February 1961) is an English former professional darts player who competed in Professional Darts Corporation (PDC) events. He used the nickname "The Rocket" for his matches. Baxter was known for his fast robotic throwing action. He currently resides in his hometown Blackpool. Baxter is widely regarded as one of the best players never to have won a major TV title. He is still active on the exhibition circuit.

BDO
Baxter played on the North American circuit during the 1980s and when he participated in the British Darts Organisation he had a consistent record for reaching the final stages of their Open events. As well as winning the Isle of Man Open three times, the Welsh Open twice, and the Syracuse Open, German Open, Denmark Open, Swiss Open, Finnish Open and the Welsh Classic once.

He made his World Championship debut in 1991 and won his debut match against Bruno Raes, but lost in the second round to Jocky Wilson. Despite hitting the second highest average of the first round at the 1992, Baxter lost 1-3 to Bob Anderson. After failing to qualify for the 1993 event Baxter was seeded second for the 1994 World Championship after the top player left the BDO and to form the WDC. Baxter lost in the first round to the eventual champion John Part.

After missing out again in 1995 he reached the quarter-finals for the first time in 1996 when he was beaten by Richie Burnett. 
Baxter was seeded seventh for the 1997 World Championship but lost in the second round to Mervyn King. However, later that year he reached his first major final at the 1997 Winmau World Masters, losing in the final to Graham Hunt. In 1998 he had again risen in the rankings to be seeded number two – but just as in 1994 he failed to live up his ranking and went out in the first round to Scotland's Peter Johnstone.

In 1999, he finally showed some of the form that saw him ranked second in the world by reaching the World Final for the first time. He beat Burnett, Kevin Painter, Roland Scholten and Andy Fordham before losing 5–6 in the final to Raymond van Barneveld, despite having been 3-1 and 5-4 up. Still ranked second in the world, he went back to the final in 2000 but lost 0–6 to Ted Hankey in just 46 minutes – the quickest final in the tournament's history. Baxter made his final appearance at the Lakeside Country Club in 2001 when he lost in the quarter-final against Wayne Mardle.

Baxter made many appearances as an England international, winning five WDF World Cups and five WDF Europe Cups. Baxter also played in ten British Internationals, winning all ten of them.

PDC

Baxter moved to the PDC in 2001, and showed early glimpses of the form he showed in the BDO. On his World Championship debut in 2002 he reached the quarter-finals.

However, that remains his best performance to date, and since his early days in the PDC he has struggled to reproduce his best form on a consistent basis. In 2006 and 2007, Baxter surprisingly exited in the first round.

Baxter did reach the final of 1998 World Matchplay whilst still a BDO player. The event was Baxter's first serious breakthrough tournament on television, with Baxter causing a big upset in coming from 5–9 down to defeat defending champion, Phil Taylor, 13–10 in the quarter finals. Baxter went on to reach the final, but lost 17–19 in an epic against Rod Harrington, despite Baxter having led for most of the match and having had 1 championship dart at double 20. Baxter also reached the final of the 2002 Las Vegas Desert Classic, losing to Phil Taylor. Baxter's high world ranking saw him qualify for the Premier League Darts in 2006, where he finished fifth. He has also won a regional final of the UK Open and a PDPA Players Championship, but despite a career which has shown great potential he is yet to clinch a major televised tournament success.

Baxter has thrown four competitive nine-dart finishes in a qualifying round or tournament, the latest being in the 2008 Desert Classic. However, none of them have been televised.

In the 2009 PDC World Darts Championship, Baxter defeated Finland's Marko Kantele in the first round. He then beat Denis Ovens in the second round. However, in one of the matches of the tournament, he lost to world number two Raymond van Barneveld in a sudden-death leg in the seventh and final set. After hitting the bull to throw first in the deciding leg, Baxter missed two darts at double eight to win the match.

After winning the warm-up Players Tournament in Vegas, Baxter was defeated in the first round of the 2009 Las Vegas Desert Classic by Jelle Klaasen (6–2) in July 2009.

In July 2009 Baxter competed in the World Matchplay at the Winter Gardens in Blackpool. As a native of the town, he received strong and vocal support. He narrowly defeated Jelle Klaasen and Alan Tabern in the first two rounds, before taking on James Wade in the quarter-finals. Wade was blown away by Baxter, who eventually won 16–10. However, the next day he was defeated 17–12 by Terry Jenkins in the semi-finals.

The World Grand Prix in Dublin in October 2009 saw Baxter's poor run in the competition continue as he was defeated by Steve Beaton in the opening round.

At the 2010 PDC World Darts Championship, Baxter saw off Haruki Muramatsu from Japan in round one, before beating Gary Anderson 4–0. Colin Lloyd, Baxter's third-round opponent, was swiftly despatched 4–1. He eventually lost 5–0 in the quarter-finals to van Barneveld. However, Baxter's performance was sufficient to lift him to sixth in the World Rankings, earning him automatic qualification into the 2010 Premier League.

Baxter was unfancied going into the tournament, but played surprisingly well, spending the majority of the season in the top four places of the table. However he narrowly missed out on a top-four spot, which would have earned him qualification for the semi-finals, following an 8–2 defeat to van Barneveld. Baxter ended the tournament in fifth place, level on points with the fourth-placed Mervyn King.

In June 2012, Baxter won the seventh Players Championship of the season, beating world number two and reigning world champion Adrian Lewis 6–3 in the final. It was Baxter's first ranking title for ten months. He continued his form by reaching the final of the ninth Players Championship after beating Simon Whitlock in the quarter-finals and Lewis in the semis. He faced Dave Chisnall and lost 4–6. These results ensured his place in the World Matchplay through the PDC ProTour Order of Merit, as Baxter has dropped out of the top 16 in the world rankings and therefore lost his automatic entry into the major events. He beat Chisnall in the first round, PDC newcomer Dean Winstanley in the second round and Justin Pipe in the quarter-final to reach his first hometown championship semi-final since 2009. There he faced Phil Taylor and, despite rallying from 0–6 down to trail just 6–8, was beaten 10–17. His good performance in the tournament gave him a boost in the Order of Merit, seeing him rise six places to world number 14. Baxter qualified from Group 3 of the Championship League with a 6–5 victory against Dave Chisnall. He finished 6th in the Winners Group, as he won three of his seven league matches, missing out on the play-offs by way of leg difference. After all 33 ProTour events of 2012 had been played, Baxter was 15th on the Order of Merit, which qualified him for the Players Championship Finals. He edged out Paul Nicholson 6–5 in the first round, but was then outplayed by Simon Whitlock in a 10–1 defeat, with the Australian averaging 110.

Baxter fought back from 1–3 down in sets in the second round of the 2013 World Championship against Kevin Painter to level the match at 3–3. He won the first two legs of the deciding set to be one leg away from the last 16, however, Painter won four straight legs to send Baxter out. Baxter's consistent play in the eight UK Open Qualifiers in the early part of 2013, where he was a losing quarter-finalist three times and a losing semi-finalist once, saw him placed ninth on the UK Open Order of Merit. At the tournament he beat Ken MacNeil 9–8, Lee Palfreyman 9–6 and Jelle Klaasen 9–7 to face Raymond van Barneveld in the quarter-finals. Baxter came from 0–3 to lead 7–4, before van Barneveld responded to move 9–8 ahead. Baxter forced a last leg decider and missed one dart for the match to allow the Dutchman in to hit double eight for the win. Two successive first round losses in premier events followed at the European Championship (6–5 against Mervyn King) and the World Matchplay (10–1 against Andy Hamilton). At the World Grand Prix Baxter beat Colin Lloyd 2–0 in sets before losing 3–0 to Simon Whitlock.

Baxter was defeated 3–0 by newcomer Ricky Evans in the first round of the 2014 World Championship. At the German Darts Championship he won four games to reach the semi-finals, where he lost 6–4 to Gary Anderson in the semi-finals. Baxter lost 9–5 against Adrian Lewis in the third round of the UK Open. He was knocked out in the first round of the three remaining major events he qualified for during the rest of 2014 and reached the quarter-finals of five Players Championship events, but could never advance beyond that stage.

At the 2015 World Championship, Baxter won his first televised match since the 2013 World Grand Prix by eliminating Daryl Gurney 3–1. He could only take out 17% of his doubles during his second round match with Robert Thornton in a 4–0 defeat. Baxter lost 9–4 to Jan Dekker in the fourth round of the UK Open. He failed to qualify for the World Matchplay this year ending a run of 17 straight appearances in the event. Baxter's sole quarter-final appearance of 2015 was at the 11th Players Championship by defeating Phil Taylor 6–2, but he lost 6–3 to Dave Chisnall. Baxter dropped out of the top 32 on the Order of Merit in 2015 which meant he failed to qualify for the 2016 World Championship. It was the first World Championship either PDC or BDO to not feature Baxter's name since 1995.

Baxter's run of missed major events continued as he failed to qualify for the UK Open for the first time after he had played in every other edition since it started in 2003. He did though reach the semi-finals of the eighth Players Championship by beating the likes of Kim Huybrechts and Simon Whitlock, but he lost 6–4 to Gerwyn Price. This result ensured that he would play in one major event this year as it qualified him for the Players Championship Finals, where he was defeated 6–3 by Daryl Gurney in the first round. Baxter was placed 73rd on the Order of Merit after 2017 World Championship and played in Q School in an attempt to win his spot back on tour. After losing in the final round on the last day 5–0 to Kirk Shepherd, Baxter had done enough to secure a two-year Tour Card by finishing third on the Q School Order of Merit.

Baxter struggled in 2017 and a Last 32 at the UK Open and qualifying for the German Darts Masters were scarce highlights. Baxter scaled down in 2018 and only entered twelve of the twenty-two Player Championships events. He was ranked well outside the top 64 at the end of 2018 and lost his Tour Card ahead of the World Championship. After taking a sabbatical in 2019 Baxter announced his intention to make a comeback in 2020.

World Championship performances

BDO
 1991: Second round (lost to Jocky Wilson 1–3)
 1992: First round (lost to Bob Anderson 1–3)
 1994: First round (lost to John Part 0–3)
 1996: Quarter-finals (lost to Richie Burnett 2–4)
 1997: Second round (lost to Mervyn King 2–3)
 1998: First round (lost to Peter Johnstone 2–3)
 1999: Runner-up (lost to Raymond van Barneveld 5–6)
 2000: Runner-up (lost to Ted Hankey 0–6)
 2001: Quarter-finals (lost to Wayne Mardle 3–5)

PDC
 2002: Quarter-finals (lost to Peter Manley 2–6)
 2003: Third round (lost to Kevin Painter 3–5)
 2004: Fourth round (lost to Kevin Painter 2–4)
 2005: Fourth round (lost to Bob Anderson 2–4)
 2006: First round (lost to Ray Carver 2–3)
 2007: First round (lost to Adrian Gray 2–3)
 2008: Second round (lost to Mark Dudbridge 2–4)
 2009: Third round (lost to Raymond van Barneveld 3–4)
 2010: Quarter-finals (lost to Raymond van Barneveld 0–5) 
 2011: Second round (lost to Mark Webster 0–4)
 2012: First round (lost to Steve Farmer 2–3)
 2013: Second round (lost to Kevin Painter 3–4)
 2014: First round (lost to Ricky Evans 0–3)
 2015: Second round (lost to Robert Thornton 0–4)

WSDT
 2023: First round (lost to Kevin Painter 0-3)

Career statistics

(W) Won; (F) finalist; (SF) semifinalist; (QF) quarterfinalist; (#R) rounds 6, 5, 4, 3, 2, 1; (RR) round-robin stage; (Prel.) Preliminary round; (DNQ) Did not qualify; (DNP) Did not participate; (NH) Not held

Performance timeline

BDO major finals: 3 (3 runners-up)

PDC major finals: 2 (2 runner-up)

References

External links
Darts Database Profile
Mastercaller Profile

Living people
English darts players
People from Blackpool
Professional Darts Corporation former tour card holders
1961 births
British Darts Organisation players
PDC ranking title winners